John Benbow (1768–24 February 1855) was a Conservative politician who represented Dudley in the UK Parliament in the nineteenth century. He won his seat in 1844 and served until his death in 1855.

Biography

John Benbow was born in 1768. In 1805 it was recorded that he was a solicitor practising at Lincoln's Inn, London. 

He married Elizabeth, the daughter of Charles Bradley and together they had two sons and three daughters. Elizabeth died in 1825.

In 1833, Benbow was appointed as joint executor and trustee of the estates of the late John Ward, 1st Earl of Dudley. The estates included Himley Hall and the ruins of Dudley Castle as well as land and industries in the Dudley area. 

In 1837, he stood unsuccessfully as member of parliament for Wolverhampton. Subsequently, when the sitting MP for Dudley, Thomas Hawkes resigned his seat in 1844, John Benbow, then a solicitor with the London firm, Messrs Benbow and Tucker, stood and won the election as a Conservative candidate. The defeated candidate was the anti-corn law candidate, William Rawson. 

When Lord Ward came into his inheritance in 1845, Benbow was appointed sole manager and auditor.

Benbow was subsequently re-elected in 1847 (unopposed) and 1852.

According to local chronicler C.F.G Clarke: 
Mr. Benbow was a decided Tory in politics, and a churchman in religion; his school of thought was narrow and contracted, and he looked upon all reforms and progressions with alarm and distrust. The same author wrote: 
he secured and maintained his seat as M.P. for Dudley entirely on the sufferance of the Castle power and influence.

According to Hansard, he never spoke in Parliament during the time he was MP for Dudley.

John Benbow died on 24 February 1855, at Hastings, whilst still MP for Dudley, triggering a by-election that was won by Sir Stafford Northcote.

References

1768 births
1855 deaths
Conservative Party (UK) MPs for English constituencies
UK MPs 1841–1847
UK MPs 1847–1852
UK MPs 1852–1857